Femina Miss India 2020 was the 57th edition of the Femina Miss India beauty pageant. Due to the COVID-19 pandemic. Due to the COVID-19 pandemic, the entire Femina Miss India contest was held digitally for the first time in the contest's history. The competition was divided into four stages, with the grand finale taking place on 10 February 2021 at the Hyatt Regency Hotel in Mumbai.

Suman Rao of Rajasthan crowned Manasa Varanasi of Telangana as the winner, earning the right to represent India at Miss World 2021..

Shivani Jadhav of Chhattisgarh crowned Manika Sheokand of Haryana as her successor. She will represent India at Miss Grand International 2021.

Runner-up was Femina Miss India Uttar Pradesh, Manya Singh. She graduated from Mumbai's Thakur College of Science and Commerce. The success story of this Mumbai rickshaw driver's daughter has been widely publicised in Indian media.

Results 
Color keys

Sub Title Awards

Format 
The registration form was published on the organization's official website on 5 October 2020 and remained open until 2 November 2020. The format was updated to include more reduced height criteria (5 ft 3 in). Shortlisted were 31 finalists, 28 of whom were state representatives, one each from Delhi and Jammu and Kashmir, and a collective representative from the remaining union territories. The contest's progress was scheduled to be completed in four stages, with the grand finale taking place in February 2021.

The Four Phases 
Due to COVID-19 restrictions, the selection and first phase (October & November) of the finals were entirely digital. Applicants for this year's competition went through an online selection process in which they were judged on four key parameters: appearance, personality, talent, interview, and walk down the ramp. A panel judged each candidate, and the entries were narrowed down to groups of finalists for each state.

A series of online interviews were conducted in the second phase of the contest (November) to select 31 state winners who would form the final pool of contestants for Femina Miss India 2020.

The third phase of the contest, which involved the 31 state finalists, was held online (December 2020 & January 2021). State winners were trained in a holistic curriculum from the comfort of their homes, consisting of classes and interactive sessions facilitated by industry experts on topics ranging from skincare to self-expression, from style from the changing room to the ramp. State winners also received training in content creation and social media management, in addition to presentation and grooming. This training would allow the finalists to document their experiences during both preparation and competition, and it was shared via social media and live streaming sessions, allowing fans to participate in the experience of becoming Miss India like never before.

The 31 finalists were then reduced to a Top 15 list. The selected ladies advanced to the final round of the competition in Mumbai, which was held in the traditional format. The fewer contests were held to ensure proper social distancing protocols.

The pageant's final phase (2020), the Grand Finale, was produced and broadcast as a prerecorded television show featuring artist performances, sponsor integrations, and contestant rounds, culminating in the announcement of the Top 3.

Mentor 
The contest was mentored by Bollywood film actress and Femina Miss India 2002, Neha Dhupia. She coached the contestants through the rounds of the competition as a mentor, assisting them with overall development on their journey to becoming a beauty queen. Dhupia also announced the 31 finalists from the top five states from each zone, namely North, North East, South, East, West, and Union territory with Delhi.

Judges 
Neha Dhupia - Femina Miss India 2002
Chitrangada Singh - Actress
Shane Peacock - Fashion designer
Falguni Peacock - Fashion designer
Pulkit Samrat - Actor

Contestants
The following is the list of the official delegates of Miss India 2020 representing 30 states +1 common winners from all Union territories of the country:
Color key

Notes

Replacements

References

External links
 Miss India Official Website

2020
2021 beauty pageants
2021 in India
Beauty pageants in India
Events postponed due to the COVID-19 pandemic